Landrés rímur is a 15th century rímur cycle based on a part of Karlamagnús saga. It deals with the tribulations of Queen Ólíf and her son Landrés who are betrayed by the evil Mílon. From the mansöngr of the rímur, it is clear that the author was a woman. This is the only known case of female authorship for a medieval rímur cycle. The cycle was dated by Finnur Jónsson as "hardly younger than 1450" and by Haukur Þorgeirsson to the period 1450–1500. The oldest surviving manuscript is the mid-16th century vellum manuscript Staðarhólsbók. The cycle was printed as part of Finnur Jónsson's Rímnasafn edition of the oldest rímur.

References

 Staðarhólsbók, AM 604 b 4to.
 Staðarhólsbók, AM 604 c 4to.
 Björn Karel Þórólfsson. 1934. Rímur fyrir 1600. Copenhagen. In Icelandic.
 Finnur Jónsson. 1902. Den oldnorske og oldislandske litteraturs historie. Volume III. Copenhagen. In Danish.
 Finnur Jónsson (editor). 1913–1922. Rímnasafn. Volume II. Copenhagen.
 Haukur Þorgeirsson. 2013. Hljóðkerfi og bragkerfi Stoðhljóð, tónkvæði og önnur úrlausnarefni í íslenskri bragsögu ásamt útgáfu á Rímum af Ormari Fraðmarssyni. Ph.D thesis, University of Iceland. In Icelandic.
 Louis-Jensen, Jonna. 1992. "Om Ólíf og Landrés, vers og prosa samt kvinder og poeter". Eyvindarbók. Oslo. In Danish.

Notes

Old Norse poetry
Matter of France
Rímur